Ismajl Beka (born 31 October 1999) is a Kosovan professional footballer who plays as a centre-back for Swiss club Luzern.

Club career

Rapperswil-Jona
On 10 February 2020, Beka signed a one-and-a-half year contract with Swiss Promotion League club Rapperswil-Jona. After the transfer, his debut and the league was postponed due to COVID-19 pandemic. His debut with Rapperswil-Jona came on 6 August in the 2019–20 Swiss Cup quarter-final against Sion after being named in the starting line-up. His league debut with Rapperswil-Jona came nine days later in a 1–1 away draw against Bellinzona after being named in the starting line-up. Four days after league debut, he scored his first goal for Rapperswil-Jona in his third appearance for the club in a 2–1 home win over Breitenrain Bern in Swiss Promotion League.

Return to Wil
On 10 June 2022, Beka signed a two-year contract with Swiss Challenge League club Wil. His debut with Wil came on 17 July in a 2–0 home win against Neuchâtel Xamax after being named in the starting line-up. Fourteen days after debut, he scored his first goal for Wil in his third appearance for the club in a 2–0 home win over Vaduz in Swiss Challenge League.

Luzern
On 31 August 2022, Beka signed a three-year contract with Swiss Super League club Luzern and received squad number 30. His debut with Luzern came four days later in a 0–2 home defeat against Servette after coming on as a substitute at 69th minute in place of Leny Meyer.

International career

Under-19
On 1 October 2017, Beka was named as part of the Kosovo U19 squad for 2018 UEFA European Under-19 Championship qualifications. His debut came two days later in a 2018 UEFA European Under-19 Championship qualification match against Austria U19 after being named in the starting line-up.

Under-21
On 4 October 2018, Beka received a call-up from Kosovo U21 for the 2019 UEFA European Under-21 Championship qualification match against Israel U21, he was an unused substitute in that match.

References

External links

1999 births
Living people
People from Frauenfeld
Kosovan footballers
Kosovo youth international footballers
Swiss men's footballers
Swiss people of Kosovan descent
Swiss people of Albanian descent
Association football central defenders
Swiss Promotion League players
FC Rapperswil-Jona players
Swiss Challenge League players
FC Wil players
Swiss Super League players
FC Luzern players